José Pedraza may refer to:

José Pedraza (boxer) (born 1989), Puerto Rican boxer
José Pedraza (racewalker) (1937–1998), Mexican race walker